Steeplehouse and Wirksworth Goods Yard was a goods station located on the Cromford and High Peak Railway in Wirksworth, Derbyshire. It consisted of three sidings and a few goods sheds. Mostly for moving mineral and quarry traffic. It closed in 1967 along with the rest of the line. And today, nothing remains of the goods yard. Today, a section of the former line is used by the Steeplehouse Grange Light Railway.

References 

Disused railway stations in Derbyshire
Railway stations in Great Britain closed in 1967